"Bicycle Race" is a song by the British rock band Queen. It was released on their 1978 album Jazz and written by Queen's lead singer Freddie Mercury. It was released as a double A-side single together with the song "Fat Bottomed Girls", reaching number 11 in the UK Singles Chart and number 24 in the Billboard Hot 100 in the US. The song is included in their 1981 Greatest Hits compilation. It is also one of the most downloaded bicycle-themed songs.

The song is notable for its video featuring a bicycle race with nude women at Wimbledon Stadium. The controversial video was edited or even banned in several countries. The song itself has appeared in various media with a bicycle theme.

Composition
The song was written by Freddie Mercury and was inspired by watching the 18th stage of the 1978 Tour de France passing Montreux, where the band were recording Jazz in the Mountain Studios. It starts with a chorus unaccompanied by instruments. The chorus is followed by two verses connected with a bridge, both followed by a chorus. Around the middle of the song is a solo played with numerous bicycle bells.

Reception
Cash Box called it "a jaunty theatrical tribute to bike riding."  Record World said that it combines "inventive lyrics and harmonies" with class.

Lyrics
The lyrics are topical for the time and contain social, political, and pop culture references, such as religion, Vietnam War, Watergate, cocaine, fictional characters (Peter Pan, Frankenstein and Superman), and the films Jaws and Star Wars.

Brian May has said that the song was not an autobiographical portrait of Mercury and that Mercury did not particularly enjoy bicycling, also noting that despite the lyric "I don't like Star Wars", Mercury was a Star Wars fan.

The song references the band's song "Fat Bottomed Girls" with the line "fat bottomed girls, they'll be riding today". "Fat Bottomed Girls" reciprocates with "Get on your bikes and ride!" The two songs were released together as a double A-sided single.

Music video
Filmed by Denis de Vallance, the promotional video featured 65 nude women, all professional models, bicycle racing at Wimbledon Greyhound Stadium, southwest London. The group rented the stadium and several dozen bicycles for one day for filming the scene; however, when the renting company became aware of the way their bikes were used, they requested that the group purchase all the bicycle seats. The original video used special effects to hide the nudity. However, due to the nudity, the video is age-restricted on YouTube and banned in several countries, including China.

Distribution
The song was released as a single and is also included in the following albums and box sets: Queen, Bohemian Rhapsody, 15 Of The Best, Queen Live In Concert, Greatest Hits and The Singles Collection Volume 1.

The single was mostly distributed in 1978, on 7-inch vinyl records, with "Fat Bottomed Girls" on the B-side and EMI record label. In Argentina, the titles were translated as "" and "" respectively. The labels were changed to Pepita in Hungary and to Elektra in the US, Canada, Australia, New Zealand and Japan. The Polish issue had the label of Tonpress and either "Spread Your Wings" or nothing on the B-side. Both 7-inch and 12-inch records were issued in the US; there the song also appeared in 1979, on the B-side of the single "Crazy Little Thing Called Love". In nearly all countries, the covers featured a backside photo of a naked woman on a racing bike, with a red bikini painted over the original photo. A brassiere was added to the US covers.

Personnel
Freddie Mercury – lead and backing vocals, piano, bicycle bells
Brian May – electric guitar, backing vocals, bicycle bells
Roger Taylor – drums, backing vocals, bicycle bells
John Deacon – bass guitar, bicycle bells

Chart performance

Certifications

Sample
The song's chorus was sampled by Eminem in "C'mon Let Me Ride" by Skylar Grey.

Alternate artwork

A bicycle race with nude women was held to promote the Jazz album, the single and the "Fat Bottomed Girls" single. This photo was included as a fold-out poster with the album Jazz. It was also included as an alternate single cover.

References

External links
 
 Lyrics at Queen official website

Queen (band) songs
1978 singles
Songs written by Freddie Mercury
Songs about bicycles
Song recordings produced by Roy Thomas Baker
EMI Records singles
Elektra Records singles
Hollywood Records singles
1978 songs
Obscenity controversies in music